The Borough of Chorley is a local government district with borough status in Lancashire, England. The population of the Borough at the 2011 census was 107,155. It is named after its largest settlement, the town of Chorley.

History
The non-metropolitan district of Chorley was formed on 1 April 1974, covering the area of four former districts, which were abolished at the same time:
Adlington Urban District
Chorley Municipal Borough
Chorley Rural District
Withnell Urban District
The new district was named Chorley, and the borough status previously held by the town was passed to the new district on the day that it came into being, allowing the chairman of the council to take the title of mayor.

Council

Elections are generally held three years out of every four, with a third of the council elected each time. In the fourth year where there are no borough council elections, elections for Lancashire County Council as the higher tier authority for the area are held instead. Chorley Borough Council has been controlled by the Labour Party since 2012, with Alistair Bradley serving as leader of the council since then. The next election is due in 2023.

Premises
The council's main offices are at the Civic Offices on Union Street in Chorley. Council meetings are held at Chorley Town Hall.

Parishes

With exception of the town of Chorley, which remains an unparished area, the borough has twenty-three civil parishes: 
Adlington
Anderton
Anglezarke
Astley Village
Bretherton
Brindle
Charnock Richard
Clayton-le-Woods
Coppull
Croston
Cuerden
Eccleston
Euxton
Heapey
Heath Charnock
Heskin
Hoghton
Mawdesley
Rivington
Ulnes Walton
Wheelton
Whittle-le-Woods
Withnell

Wards
Chorley Council is made up of 42 councillors, representing the following 14 electoral wards:

Adlington & Anderton
Buckshaw & Whittle
Chorley East
Chorley North East
Chorley North West
Chorley North & Astley
Chorley South East & Heath Charnock
Chorley South West
Clayton East, Brindle & Hoghton
Clayton West & Cuerden
Coppull
Croston, Mawdesley & Euxton South
Eccleston, Heskin & Charnock Richard
Euxton

Settlements

Parliamentary constituency
The Chorley Parliament constituency is a constituency in the House of Commons, and from 1997 until 2010 it was coterminous with the borough. Through boundary changes, Croston, Eccleston, Bretherton and Mawdesley were transferred to the South Ribble constituency. The current Member of Parliament for Chorley is Lindsay Hoyle, who was first elected to the seat in 1997.

Freedom of the Borough
The following people and military units have received the Freedom of the Borough of Chorley.

Individuals
 Sir Henry Hibbert: 25 September 1922.
 Alderman James Winder Stone: 25 September 1922.
 Alderman Arnold Gillett: 17 June 1931.
 Alderman J. Fearnhead: 12 July 1944.
 Douglas Hacking, 1st Baron Hacking: 30 November 1946.
 Mrs Bertha Maude Gillett: 24 November 1960.

Military Units
 The Queen's Lancashire Regiment: 2005.
 5 General Medical Support Regiment RAMC: 2007.
 The Duke of Lancaster's Regiment: 2007.
 3 Medical Regiment: 6 June 2015.
 The Lancashire Constabulary.

References 

 
Local government in Chorley
Non-metropolitan districts of Lancashire
Boroughs in England